"The Roof (Back in Time)" is a song by American singer-songwriter Mariah Carey, taken from her sixth studio album, Butterfly (1997). It was released as the third single from the album in Europe, on March 16, 1998, by Columbia Records. Similar to the treatments of "Butterfly" and "Breakdown", "The Roof" received a limited worldwide release due to Carey's conflict at the time with Sony. The song was written and produced by Carey and Trackmasters, and is built around a sample from "Shook Ones (Part II)" (1995) by American hip hop duo Mobb Deep. The song's lyrics recount an intimate roof-top encounter between lovers, and how the memory affects the protagonist. The extended remix features a rap verse by Mobb Deep; both versions were praised by contemporary music critics.

In the music video, Carey is seen in a limousine recounting an encounter she shared on a rainy night. Additionally, past scenes of the event are shown, with Carey caressing her lover at a roof-top party. During the video's climax, Carey opens the limousine's sunroof and stands in the rain, trying to recapture the moments she shared in the rain. Carey performed the song live during her Butterfly World Tour in 1998. Due to the song's limited release, "The Roof" did not chart in most major music markets, with the exception of The Netherlands and the United Kingdom, where it peaked at numbers 63 and 87, respectively.

In addition, "The Roof" was added to Carey's compilation album The Ballads (2009). In 2020, Carey revealed that the song was about her relationship with New York Yankees shortstop Derek Jeter, whom she first kissed on the roof of his apartment building.

On April 14, 2022, Carey revealed a re-recorded and re-imagined version of the song, titled "The Roof (When I Feel the Need)" for her course on MasterClass. The song features vocals from R&B singer Brandy. The collaboration appears on the expanded edition of Butterfly for the album's 25th anniversary, released on September 16, 2022.

Composition 

The song is a slow and sultry song, which blends hip-hop and contemporary R&B genres. It incorporates drum notes, including heavy beats and grooves. The song's second version features a rap version from Mobb Deep. The song samples the melody from "Shook Ones Part II" by Mobb Deep, incorporating it into chorus and bridge. As part of "layering the song," background vocals are featured throughout the chorus and sections of the bridge. It is set in the signature common time, and is written in the key of B-flat minor. It features a basic chord progression of A-F1. Carey's vocal range in the song spans from the low note of E3 to the high note of F5; the piano and guitar pieces range from F3 to G5 as well. The song contains lyrics written by Carey, who produced the song's melody and chorus as well. Aside from assisting with its chord progression, Cory Rooney co-arranged and produced the track as well. Author Chris Nickson felt the song was extremely important for Carey's musical transition, writing "Lyrically, this was some of her best work ever, the melody slinky and overtly sexy, confirmation – as if any was needed at this point! – that this was the new Mariah."

Critical reception 
"The Roof" was acclaimed by contemporary music critics for its choice of vocal work, instrumentation, and lyrics. David Browne from Entertainment Weekly praised the song as well as Carey's choice of vocals, writing "Carey is still a vocal grandstander capable of turning all into a six-syllable word. Yet for most of the album she keeps her notorious octave-climbing chops at bay. Showing some admirable restraint, she nestles herself into the downy-soft beats of 'The Roof'." Rich Juzwiak from Slant wrote "Little more than yearning, kissing, and remembering happens during the course of 'The Roof,' a rough-enough R&B revision of Mobb Deep's 'The Shook Ones.' But lyrically Mariah the writer is vivid, sometimes shockingly clever (rhyming 'liberated' with 'Moet' is a stroke of genius)."

Chart performance 
"The Roof" was chosen as the third single from Butterfly, receiving an airplay-only release. Because of conflict between Carey and her record label at the time, Sony Music Entertainment, it was only given a commercial release in Europe, while "Breakdown" was released throughout Oceania. Although not officially released there, in the UK the song peaked at number 87 during May 1998, and first appeared on its R&B chart at the end of March. "The Roof" stayed in the UK Singles Chart for two weeks, charting on import sales only, before falling outside the top 100. In the Netherlands, it performed weakly as well, peaking at number 63 while spending five weeks fluctuating in the Single Top 100.

Music video 

The music video for "The Roof" garnered critical acclaim, and was ranked 18th on Slant's "100 Greatest Music Videos". Sal Ciquemani, from Slant, gave the video a positive review, complimenting Carey's choice to pair the sultry song with a "sophisticated tale of a sexy rooftop encounter". The video re-tells a story of Carey reminiscing a past love and a night they shared together on a rainy roof-top. The video's setting revolves around a dark limousine, a decrepit NYC apartment, and a rainy roof-top, where "Carey is featured at her most vulnerable, with runny mascara and drenched in the cold rainy night." In the conclusion of his review of the video, Ciquemani wrote: "When Carey rises through the limo's sunroof and relishes the warm November rain, she's not drunk on the bubbly but on the memory of past delights."

The video was directed by Carey and Diane Martel during the spring of 1998. The music video begins with Carey sitting alone in a limousine, recalling a night she shared some time previous. As scenes of Carey reminiscing in the limo are shown, clips of her dressing in an old apartment are presented. Eventually, Carey joins a roof-top party one night, where she begins dancing and caressing her lover. As the passion between them grown, rain begins to fall, showering everyone atop the edifice. As these scenes end, Carey in the present opens the sun-roof of the limo and stands into the rainy night, trying to recapture those magical moments she shared on that rainy roof-top encounter. The video ends with a wet Carey lying in the back of the limousine, sad and lonely.

Live performances 
"The Roof" has been performed few times throughout Carey's career. The song was performed during her Butterfly World Tour in 1998. During the performances, live male and female dancers were present on stage, grooving and performing classic routines. Carey wore a short beige ensemble and performed light classical dances, alongside a male partner. The song was performed on select dates of Carey's 2014 The Elusive Chanteuse Show tour. Carey would later perform a snippet of it acapella during her set at Jimmy Kimmel Live! while promoting #1 To Infinity, later expressing to be happy at the fact the audience knew the lyrics to the song.

Formats and track listings
European maxi CD single
"The Roof (Back In Time)" (Album Version) – 5:15
"The Roof (Back In Time)" (Mobb Deep Radio Edit) - 4:26
"The Roof (Back In Time)" (Mobb Deep Extended Version) – 5:31
"The Roof (Back In Time)" (Full Crews Club Mix) – 5:02
"The Roof (Back In Time)" (Full Crew Mix) – 3:50

Digital EP

"The Roof (Back In Time)" (Mobb Deep Extended Version) – 5:31
"The Roof (Back In Time)" (Mobb Deep Radio Edit) – 4:24
"The Roof (Back In Time)" (Full Crew Radio Edit No Rap) – 3:59
"The Roof (Back In Time)" (Full Crew Club Mix) – 5:02
"The Roof (Back In Time)" (Full Crew Mix) – 5:03
"The Roof (Back In Time)" (Morales Radio Mix) – 4:01
"The Roof (Back In Time)" (Morales Funky Club Mix) – 8:34
"The Roof (Back in Time)" (Morales After Hours Mix) – 9:13
"The Roof (Back in Time)" (Morales Bass Man Mix) – 8:17

Remixes
David Morales Mixes
"The Roof (Back in Time)" (Morales Funky Club Mix) – 8:28
"The Roof (Back in Time)" (Morales Radio Mix) – 4:00
"The Roof (Back in Time)" (Morales Bass Man Mix) – 8:14
"The Roof (Back in Time)" (Morales After Hours Mix) – 9:13
Mobb Deep Mixes
"The Roof (Back in Time)" (Mobb Deep Extended Remix) – 5:31
"The Roof (Back in Time)" (Mobb Deep Radio Edit) – 4:26
Full Crew Mixes
"The Roof (Back in Time)" (Full Crew Mix) – 4:58
"The Roof (Back in Time)" (Full Crew Club Mix) – 5:02
"The Roof (Back in Time)" (Full Crew Radio Edit) – 3:50

Credits and personnel 
Credits adapted from Butterfly liner notes.
 Mariah Carey – co-production, songwriting (music and lyrics), vocals, Background vocals
 Jean Claude Oliver – songwriting (music and lyrics), vocals
 Samuel Barnes – songwriting (music and lyrics), vocals
 Cory Rooney – mixing, special effects
 Albert Johnson – songwriting (music)
 Kejuan Waliek Muchita – songwriting (music)
Kelly Price - background vocals

Charts

Release history

References

Bibliography 

 
 

1990s ballads
1998 singles
Mariah Carey songs
Mobb Deep songs
Music videos directed by Diane Martel
Music videos directed by Mariah Carey
Contemporary R&B ballads
Songs written by Mariah Carey
Songs written by Cory Rooney
Columbia Records singles
1997 songs
Song recordings produced by Trackmasters
Songs written by Samuel Barnes (songwriter)
Songs written by Jean-Claude Olivier
Sony Music singles